Bad Nation Township is a township in Mellette County, in the U.S. state of South Dakota.

History
The township has the name of Bad Nation, a Native American chieftain.

References

Townships in Mellette County, South Dakota
Townships in South Dakota